Dwight Lyman Moody (February 5, 1837 – December 26, 1899), also known as D. L. Moody, was an American evangelist and publisher connected with Keswickianism, who founded the Moody Church, Northfield School and Mount Hermon School in Massachusetts (now Northfield Mount Hermon School), Moody Bible Institute and Moody Publishers. One of his most famous quotes was "Faith makes all things possible...  Love makes all things easy." Moody gave up his lucrative boot and shoe business to devote his life to revivalism, working first in the Civil War with Union troops through YMCA in the United States Christian Commission. In Chicago, he built one of the major evangelical centers in the nation, which is still active. Working with singer Ira Sankey, he toured the country and the British Isles, drawing large crowds with a dynamic speaking style.

Early life
Dwight Moody was born in Northfield, Massachusetts, as the seventh child in a large family. His father, Edwin J. Moody (1800–1841), was a small farmer and stonemason. His mother was Betsey Moody (née Holton; 1805–1896). They had five sons and a daughter before Dwight's birth. His father died when Dwight was age four; fraternal twins, a boy, and a girl were born one month after the father's death. Their mother struggled to support the nine children but had to send some off to work for their room and board. Dwight too was sent off, where he received cornmeal, porridge, and milk three times a day. He complained to his mother, but when she learned that he was getting all he wanted to eat, she sent him back. During this time, she continued to send the children to church. Together with his eight siblings, Dwight was raised in the Unitarian church. His oldest brother ran away and was not heard from by the family until many years later.

When Moody turned 17, he moved to Boston to work (after receiving many job rejections locally) in an uncle's shoe store. One of the uncle's requirements was that Moody attend the Congregational Church of Mount Vernon, where Dr. Edward Norris Kirk served as the pastor. In April 1855 Moody was converted to evangelical Christianity when his Sunday school teacher, Edward Kimball, talked to him about how much God loved him. His conversion sparked the start of his career as an evangelist. Moody first applied to the church in May 1855, but he was not received as a church member until May 4, 1856.

According to Moody's memoir, his teacher, Edward Kimball, said:

Civil War

D. L. Moody "could not conscientiously enlist" in the Union Army during the Civil War, later describing himself as "a Quaker" in this respect. After the Civil War started, he became involved with the United States Christian Commission of YMCA. He paid nine visits to the battlefront, being present among the Union soldiers after the Battle of Shiloh (a.k.a. Pittsburg Landing) and the Battle of Stones River; he also entered Richmond, Virginia, with the troops of General Grant.

On August 28, 1862, Moody married Emma C. Revell, with whom he had a daughter, Emma Reynolds Moody, and two sons, William Revell Moody and Paul Dwight Moody.

Chicago and the postwar years

In 1858, he started a Sunday school. 

The growing Sunday School congregation needed a permanent home, so Moody started a church in Chicago, the Illinois Street Church in 1864.

In June 1871 at an International Sunday School Convention in Indianapolis, Indiana, Dwight Moody met Ira D. Sankey. He was a gospel singer, with whom Moody soon began to cooperate and collaborate.
Four months later, in October 1871, the Great Chicago Fire destroyed Moody's church building, as well as his house and those of most of his congregation. Many had to flee the flames, saving only their lives, and ending up completely destitute. Moody, reporting on the disaster, said about his own situation that: "...he saved nothing but his reputation and his Bible."

In the years after the fire, Moody's wealthy Chicago patron John V. Farwell tried to persuade him to make his permanent home in the city, offering to build a new house for Moody and his family. But the newly famous Moody, also sought by supporters in New York, Philadelphia, and elsewhere, chose a tranquil farm he had purchased near his birthplace in Northfield, Massachusetts. He felt he could better recover in a rural setting from his lengthy preaching trips.

Northfield became an important location in evangelical Christian history in the late 19th century as Moody organized summer conferences. These were led and attended by prominent Christian preachers and evangelists from around the world. Western Massachusetts has had a rich evangelical tradition including Jonathan Edwards preaching in colonial Northampton and C.I. Scofield preaching in Northfield. A protégé of Moody founded Moores Corner Church, in Leverett, Massachusetts.

Moody founded two schools here: Northfield School for Girls, founded in 1879, and the Mount Hermon School for Boys, founded in 1881. In the late 20th century, these merged, forming today's co-educational, nondenominational Northfield Mount Hermon School.

Evangelistic travels

During a trip to the United Kingdom in the spring of 1872, Moody became well known as an evangelist.  Literary works published by the Moody Bible Institute claim that he was the greatest evangelist of the 19th century. He preached almost a hundred times and came into communion with the Plymouth Brethren.  On several occasions, he filled stadia of a capacity of 2,000 to 4,000.  According to his memoir, in the Botanic Gardens Palace, he attracted an audience estimated at between 15,000 and 30,000.

That turnout continued throughout 1874 and 1875, with crowds of thousands at all of his meetings. During his visit to Scotland, Moody was helped and encouraged by Andrew A. Bonar. The famous London Baptist preacher, Charles Spurgeon, invited him to speak, and he promoted the American as well. When Moody returned to the US, he was said to frequently attract crowds of 12,000 to 20,000 were as common as they had been in England.  President Grant and some of his cabinet officials attended a Moody meeting on January 19, 1876.  He held evangelistic meetings from Boston to New York, throughout New England, and as far west as San Francisco, also visiting other West Coast towns from Vancouver, British Columbia, Canada to San Diego.

Moody aided the work of cross-cultural evangelism by promoting "The Wordless Book," a teaching tool developed in 1866 by Charles Spurgeon. In 1875, Moody added a fourth color to the design of the three-color evangelistic device: gold — to "represent heaven." This "book" has been and is still used to teach uncounted thousands of illiterate people, young and old, around the globe about the gospel message.

Moody visited Britain with Ira D. Sankey, with Moody preaching and Sankey singing at meetings.  Together they published books of Christian hymns.  In 1883 they visited Edinburgh and raised £10,000 for the building of a new home for the Carrubbers Close Mission.  Moody later preached at the laying of the foundation stone for what is now called the Carrubbers Christian Centre, one of the few buildings on the Royal Mile which continues to be used for its original purpose.

Moody greatly influenced the cause of cross-cultural Christian missions after he met Hudson Taylor, a pioneer missionary to China. He actively supported the China Inland Mission and encouraged many of his congregation to volunteer for service overseas.

International acclaim
His influence was felt among Swedes.  Being of English heritage, never visiting Sweden or any other Scandinavian country, and never speaking a word of Swedish, nonetheless, he became a hero revivalist among Swedish Mission Friends in Sweden and America.

News of Moody's large revival campaigns in Great Britain from 1873 through 1875 traveled quickly to Sweden, making "Mr. Moody" a household name in homes of many Mission Friends. Moody's sermons published in Sweden were distributed in books, newspapers, and colporteur tracts, and they led to the spread of Sweden's "Moody fever" from 1875 through 1880.

He preached his last sermon on November 16, 1899, in Kansas City, Missouri. Becoming ill, he returned home by train to Northfield. Although his illness was never diagnosed, it has been speculated that he suffered from congestive heart failure. He died on December 26, 1899, surrounded by his family. Already installed as the leader of his Chicago Bible Institute,   R. A. Torrey succeeded Moody as its pastor.

Works
Heaven Diggory Press 
 Prevailing Prayer—What Hinders it? Diggory Press 
Secret Power Diggory Press 
The Ten Commandments
Also, A Life for Christ—What a Normal Christian Life Looks Like.
 The Way to God and How to Find it

Legacy
Religious historian James Findlay says that:
 Speaking before thousands in the dark business suit, bearded, rotund Dwight L. Moody seemed the epitome of the "businessman in clerical garb" who typified popular religion in late 19th-century America... Earthy, unlettered, a dynamo of energy, the revivalist was very much a man of his times... Moody adapted revivalism, one of the major institutions of evangelical Protestantism, to the urban context.  ... His organizational ability, demonstrated in the great revivals he conducted in England, combined to fashion his spectacular career as the creator of modern mass revivalism.

Ten years after Moody's death the Chicago Avenue Church was renamed the Moody Church in his honor, and the Chicago Bible Institute has likewise renamed the Moody Bible Institute.

During World War II the Liberty ship  was built in Panama City, Florida, and named in his honor.

See also

William Phillips Hall, a close friend that was influenced to become an evangelist and lay preacher.
Horatio Spafford, a friend of Moody who wrote the words to the hymn It Is Well With My Soul
Northfield Mount Hermon School

References

Sources
 "Dwight Moody: evangelist with a common touch" Christianity Today, August 8, 2008.
 Christian Biography Resources
 Dorsett, L. W. A Passion for Souls: The Life of D. L. Moody. 1997
 Findlay, J. F. Jr. Dwight L. Moody: American Evangelist 1837–1899. 1969
 Gundry, S. N. Love them in: The Proclamation Theology of D. L. Moody. 1976
 Evensen, B. J. God's Man for Gilded Age: D. L. Moody and the Rise of Mass Evangelism. 2003
 Gloege, Timothy. Guaranteed Pure: The Moody Bible Institute, Business, and the Making of Modern Evangelicalism (2017)
 Gustafson, David M. "D.L. Moody and the Swedish-American Evangelical Free." Swedish-American Historical Quarterly 55 (2004): 107–135. online
 Hamilton, Michael S. "The Interdenominational Evangelicalism of D.L. Moody and the Problem of Fundamentalism" in Darren Dochuk et al. eds. American Evangelicalism: George Marsden and the State of American Religious History (2014) ch 11.
 Moody, Paul Dwight. The Shorter Life of D. L. Moody. 1900  online

External links

Recording of Moody reading the Beatitudes
Sample sermons by D. L. Moody
"Shall I enter the Army?" Moody said, "No."
 
 
 
 Glad Tidings, sermons by D. L. Moody
 The Gospel Awakening, sermons by D. L. Moody
books by D. L. Moody

1837 births
1899 deaths
19th-century American male writers
19th-century American musicians
19th-century evangelicals
19th-century American philanthropists
American Christian hymnwriters
American Christian pacifists
American evangelicals
American evangelists
American sermon writers
Christian revivalists
Evangelical writers
Founders of schools in the United States
Keswickianism
Moody Bible Institute people
People from Northfield, Massachusetts
Songwriters from Massachusetts
YMCA leaders